Portland and Westmoreland Places is a historic district in the Central West End neighborhood of St. Louis, Missouri. It is adjacent to the northeast corner of Forest Park. The district consists of 94 houses built circa 1890 to 1960. A wide variety of architectural styles are represented, including some of the finest examples of late nineteenth and early twentieth century architecture in the city.

The district includes houses along Portland Place and Westmoreland Place between Union Boulevard on the west and North Kingshighway Boulevard to the east. The district was added to the National Register of Historic Places in 1974.

Due to a quirk of the time period, a number of the streets are private streets rather than public ones. In the late 1800s, when the city government of St. Louis had not yet adopted a policy of aggressively paving streets, homeowners in the area privately paved the roads at their own expense, but also allowed them the right of exclusion on them.  The result was something similar to a "gated community", albeit not entirely, as some public road access still exists.  Additionally, under the reign of St. Louis mayor Vincent Schoemehl, various city streets were blocked to create more isolated cul-de-sacs during a time of population decline for the city; while many of these changes were eventually undone, these changes tended to persist more in wealthy communities such as Portland and Westmoreland Places.

2020 gun-toting incident

In the wake of the murder of George Floyd, on June 28 around 500 protesters marched to Mayor Lyda Krewson's house. They used the private street Portland Place to try and cut through to hers a couple blocks away. Two residents, Mark and Patricia McCloskey, pointed guns at the protesters, and a video of them doing so went viral, being retweeted by President Donald Trump.

On July 20, the couple were each charged with one count of unlawful use of a weapon, a felony.

References

Historic districts on the National Register of Historic Places in Missouri
National Register of Historic Places in St. Louis
Central West End, St. Louis